Ida Maria Erika Ingemarsdotter (born 26 April, 1985) is a Swedish cross-country skiing coach and former skier who competed between 2003 and 2019.

Skiing career
Ingemarsdotter has a total of five individual victories at various levels up to 15 km since 2003. Her best individual World Cup finish, was first place in a sprint event in Milan in 2012.

At the 2010 Winter Olympics in Vancouver, she finished fifth in the 4 × 5 km relay, 15th in the individual sprint, and 42nd in the 7.5 km + 7.5 km double pursuit events. Ingermarsdotter also competed in the 30 km event, but did not finish. At the 2014 Winter Olympics, Ingemarsdotter won gold in the 4 × 5 km relay.

She announced her retirement from cross-country skiing on 3 May 2019.

Coaching career
On 30 September, 2019, she was appointed as a coach for the Swedish National Development Cross-Country Team, substituting for Martina Höök, who will be on maternity leave for the 2019–20 season.

Cross-country skiing results
All results are sourced from the International Ski Federation (FIS).

Olympic Games
 2 medals – (1 gold, 1 bronze)

World Championships
 4 medals – (3 silver, 1 bronze)

World Cup

Season standings

Individual podiums
 2 victories – (2 )
 9 podiums – (6 , 3 )

Team podiums
 5 victories – (5 )
 11 podiums – (9 , 2 )

References

External links

 
 
 
 

1985 births
Living people
Swedish female cross-country skiers
Olympic cross-country skiers of Sweden
Olympic medalists in cross-country skiing
Olympic gold medalists for Sweden
Olympic bronze medalists for Sweden
Cross-country skiers at the 2010 Winter Olympics
Cross-country skiers at the 2014 Winter Olympics
Cross-country skiers at the 2018 Winter Olympics
Medalists at the 2014 Winter Olympics
FIS Nordic World Ski Championships medalists in cross-country skiing
Åsarna IK skiers
Tour de Ski skiers
Cross-country skiers from Jämtland County
People from Härjedalen Municipality
21st-century Swedish women